Michael J. Cinquemani is an American television writer and video game developer. He has written for The Vampire Diaries, Lucky 7 and First Wave.

Career
Cinquemani began in soap operas, as a Script Coordinator, and later Script Writer on General Hospital (2001 - 2005). He also worked on network programmes, working as Script Writer on All My Children (2008), Staff Writer on "10 Things I Hate About You" (2009) and Staff Writer on Brothers & Sisters" (2009-2011). Most recently, he wrote on Jane the Virgin (2021).

Outside of television, Cinequemani has expanded into video games, working as lead narrative designer for Harry Potter: Hogwarts Mystery. In 2022, he was made chief content officer at Fusebox Games, for its LA studio.

Awards and nominations
Daytime Emmy Award
Nomination, 2005, Best Writing, General Hospital

References

External links

21st-century American male writers
Cinquemani
American male screenwriters
American male television writers
Video game writers
Year of birth missing (living people)
Living people